A salary survey is a tool specifically for remuneration specialists and managers to define a fair and competitive salary for the employees of a company. The survey output is data on the average or median salary for a specific position, taking into consideration the region, industry, company size, etc. Input data is aggregated directly from an employer or employee.

Types of salary surveys by data source 
Salary surveys are differentiated based on their data source into those that
 obtain data from companies, 
 obtain data from employees.

Salary survey operators strive to obtain the most relevant input data possible. There is no way to generalize which approach is correct. The first option may satisfy large companies, while the second is largely for smaller companies.

Salary surveys based on data from companies 
This is the traditional approach where consulting companies obtain survey input data from specific companies. Companies are provided with a wide-ranging questionnaire to gather information about the company and its employees.

Advantages of salary surveys using data from companies 
 Long-term experience - these are global companies with long histories in the vast majority of cases.
 Brand recognition - these companies are well-established on the market and have already created a reputation.
 Consulting activities - given that salary surveys are one of the primary lines of business for these companies, they have consultants on staff who can deliver their consulting expertise in obtaining input data (ensuring data is aggregated using the correct method) and other more wide-ranging consulting activities. Such consulting may include job descriptions, evaluating specific jobs and even the creation of a salary system.
 Detailed catalogue of positions - jobs must be assigned to the correct position during the survey to ensure the compared salary corresponds to the work performed. Positions are described in detail in the survey given the long-term experience and direct connection to parent companies. The same is true of responsibilities, powers and subordination, and superiority structures, in addition to the actual job description itself.
 They facilitate international salary comparison - international salary comparisons for individual positions are possible given that the operators of these salary surveys are companies with international know-how, and identical methods are applied in dozens of countries around the world.

Disadvantages of salary surveys using data from companies 
 Lengthy process of completing the form - time demands are high given the detailed nature of the form used to obtain input data. The questionnaire includes questions that require answers from multiple departments: financial (company profits) and human resources (salaries, numbers of employees, training and education costs, etc.). A company may not answer some questions clearly if it monitors specific indicators in a different structure and if estimates are provided in the questionnaire, which deform the results.
 Partial coverage of the entire market - the goal of any salary survey is to include all types of companies, big and small, domestic and foreign, in various industries, etc. Given that only the companies that buy such a survey are involved, these surveys do not cover the entire labour market. Often they only include large and wealthy industries such as IT, telecommunications, pharmaceuticals, banking, cars, electronics, etc. Other industries such as sales, other industry, construction, etc. are composed of companies that cannot afford such a salary survey, which means their industries are not completely covered.
 Sensitive data - not every company wants to disclose sensitive data on profitability, fluctuations, and employee salaries in any specific form. Survey participants cannot avoid these questions.
 Non-current data - salary surveys based on data from employers aggregate input information over a matter of months. The standard data aggregation period is 3 to 4 months. Processing follows, which may take another 2 months. Companies may only receive the data they need after a half-year delay. The labour market changes over this time, in particular in times of economic growth, and the data is no longer up-to-date after aggregation, processing and evaluation.
 High price - salary surveys based on this approach are expensive. Prices are in the thousands of euros, depending on if the company is actively involved in the survey or does not participate and only purchases the survey results (more expensive in this case).

Salary surveys based on data from employees 
Aggregating data from employees, primarily refers to the aggregation of data using the Internet. Such methods have long been established in the US and Western Europe, and are now establishing themselves in Central and Eastern Europe, Asia and the Middle East.

Advantages of salary surveys aggregating data from employees 

 Large sample of respondents - salaries are of interest to every employee, and providing information about themselves gives the opportunity to compare their current situation with others on the labour market. It is no surprise that these types of salary surveys have a large sample of respondents. Surveys are equipped with technical resources to expose duplicate records, thereby rendering fears of misuse unjustified.
 All types of companies - employees in all types of companies are interested in salaries, regardless of the type of work, region, industry, size, company ownership, etc. Such surveys aggregate data from a multitude of different companies.
 Transparency of results - this method provides fast access to the most in-demand information to support decision-making; the information is also transparently depicted and easy to understand.
 Results without providing company data - companies use the results of such surveys without actually providing their own data. This provides an opportunity to exploit information about the market without concerns over a loss of sensitive data.
 Easy access to the required data - salary surveys of this type are accessible over the Internet. Companies have access to them anywhere with Internet connection: in offices, cafés, hotels, at home, etc.
 Currentness - data is continuously added to this type of survey; the database is propagated with new data on a daily basis with old (year-old) data automatically replaced.
 Financial accessibility - the survey method based on data from employees does not incur the same costs as surveys based on data from employers. These surveys are at a much more accessible price point for this reason. Small and medium enterprises primarily use this type of survey.
 Real employee salaries and benefits - surveys based on data from employee are directly connected to the specific positions in which the employees work. The resulting data describes the situation of a specific employee and not the general situation in the company. Companies often declare benefits such as company mobile phones, but in practice an employee may actually only be eligible for such benefit in select positions and after working for the company for at least one year.

Disadvantages of salary surveys aggregating data from employees 

 Temporary mistrust in this method - a lack of confidence occurs in undeveloped countries based on the argument that "people lie on the Internet". Experience has shown that people do not lie but rather complete questionnaires accurately if they want to obtain reliable information from a website. Respondents provide details of their own salary because they are motivated to compare their salary with others. An attempt to provide misleading information is basically lying to oneself.
 Less brand awareness - these salary surveys do not enjoy the same brand recognition as traditional salary surveys, and companies are only starting to have confidence in their results. Experience from abroad shows that it is only a matter of time until this type of surveys finds users.
 Internet population - this type of survey requires that respondents are computer literate and have Internet access. This leads to an assumption that the structure of respondents correlates to the structure of the Internet population. This population has a lower share of employees with lower levels of education and from smaller communities. This effect is mitigated by the increasing levels of computer literacy and Internet coverage.
 Level of detail of results - survey output data is a reflection of the data provided by the respondents, i.e. company employees. They cannot be asked specific details concerning remuneration as they are asked in surveys using data from companies. The average employee does not know how much education and training activities cost, company revenues, etc. As such, the survey outputs do not provide such detailed data. They are based on the most basic indicators on which salaries depend: position, region, industry, previous experience, education, etc. – all questions the respondents can answer.

What data  a salary survey should contain 
Basic, general data at the regional or industry-wide level issued by the national statistical office is now insufficient to define correct salary amounts. Salary surveys should concern specific positions defined as precisely as possible.

Average value is often communicated in salary discussions. Other indicators that more accurately describe the salary of a given position must be used as a result. In practice, companies use percentiles, the most common of which are the first and ninth decile, the first and third quartile, and the media.

It is also important to define the meaning of ‘salary’ in a salary survey. Are gross or net salaries involved? Does salary include bonuses, variable salary components and other bonuses, or does it only concern the base salary? Remuneration includes providing non-financial benefits. A company applying such a remuneration policy should review salary surveys that analyse non-financial benefits.

Trustworthy surveys openly discuss the size of samples from which outputs are calculated.

Salary survey selection criteria 
A company should consider the following aspects:

 The author of the survey - it is important that the survey is conducted by a trustworthy company. Investigate the survey operator's background online to determine its comprehension of remuneration-related matters and the labour market overall.
 Survey scope - every company is unique with its own needs. The selected survey should take into consideration the positions covered in the survey, the types of companies providing data, and various aspects: company size, industry, regional representation, company ownership, etc.
 Survey method - the survey method must be examined along with the obtained data, its processing, the manner in which deviations are removed from the data, etc. The method should meet the standards for conducting surveys.
 Number of respondents - it is clear that an increase in survey respondents correlates to more relevant results. It is essential to ensure that the number of survey respondents is published, with the results enhanced when combined with their structure using some basic characteristics (region, size, etc.)
 Companies represented in the survey - companies use salary surveys to compare their remuneration to the competition. Knowing the companies included in the survey is important. Reputable salary surveys publish a list of companies that provided their salaries for comparison.
 Size of the sample for the displayed results - publishing the total number of salary survey respondents is one thing, but publishing the number of respondents for every sample result is another. The composition of the reference sample must be considered. The greater the criteria match a company requires, the more likely it is that the sample will be smaller. If a company wants results for a given position, region, industry, previous experience, education and, for instance, age, the number of respondents may not be more than 10, even if the survey sample is robust. Some positions are simply scarce on the labour market for objective reasons.
 Relevance of job descriptions when comparing positions - every company has its own nomenclature for work positions, often based on the company's history or inherited from a parent company. This makes it important to determine if the salary survey displays individual job descriptions. It is impossible to expect that such job descriptions will provide a 100% match in every company. Small and medium enterprises often combine different responsibilities into a single position, which means these descriptions must be examined closely.
 Data validity - the labour market is lively and constantly evolving. Salaries for individual positions may rise or fall, even when the average salary in a country does not change. As a result, current data is critical when defining salaries and planning budgets. Reputable salary surveys publish the age of the data used to calculate salaries.

References

Survey
Human resource management